The 1st constituency of Val-de-Marne is a French legislative constituency in the Val-de-Marne département.

Description

The 1st constituency of Val-de-Marne lies in the centre of the department to the south west of Paris. It includes part of Saint-Maur-des-Fossés and the north of Créteil both of which form part of Paris's suburbs. The constituency is part of the more conservative eastern half of the department.

The result of the 2012 election was overturned by the Constitutional Council leading to a by-election in which the incumbent Henri Plagnol was defeated by Sylvain Berrios standing as a dissident UMP candidate.

Historic Representation

Election results

2022

 
 
 
 
 
 
 
 
|-
| colspan="8" bgcolor="#E9E9E9"|
|-

2017

 
 
 
 
 
 
 
 
|-
| colspan="8" bgcolor="#E9E9E9"|
|-

2012

 
 
 
 
 
 
 
|-
| colspan="8" bgcolor="#E9E9E9"|
|-

2007

 
 
 
 
 
 
|-
| colspan="8" bgcolor="#E9E9E9"|
|-

2002

 
 
 
 
 
 
 
|-
| colspan="8" bgcolor="#E9E9E9"|
|-

1997

 
 
 
 
 
 
 
 
|-
| colspan="8" bgcolor="#E9E9E9"|
|-
 
 

 
 
 
 
 

* UDF dissident

Sources
Official results of French elections from 2002: "Résultats électoraux officiels en France" (in French).

1